A long history of Vietnamese armour ( or 安南甲服, Vietnamese: Việt-binh khôi-giáp or An-nam giáp-phục) making exists that spanned more than two millennia. However, due to the lack of records and budget for archaeological studies, the evidence has been scarce.

Pre-history to 2nd-century
Complete absence of native history records and lack of details in Chinese records of the same eras have made tracking the development of armour in Bronze Age and Iron Age Vietnam very difficult. Instead, physical evidence has been the only source for studying of ancient Vietnamese armour.

The most common type of armour found in Northern Vietnam is mirror armour, which practically is a square or rectangular metal or wooden plate fastened to the warrior's chest. This type of armour could provide minimal protection against slashing and glancing blows. For limbs protection, there are bronze vambraces and greaves, sometimes shaped like multiple rings coiled around the wearer's forearms and legs although they were cast as single pieces. Most vambraces and greaves have small tintinnabulums attached to them. This is a feature seen also in later eras' armours.

Less common is lamellar armour, consists of small metal scales fastened together to provide protection and flexibility at the same time. Full set of lamellar armour has not yet been found but individual scales were discovered in sizable quantity. Each scale has only 2 holes for a piece of string to go through, suggesting that the method of construction may have been different from Chinese and Korean counterparts. It is not yet understood whether lamellar and mirror armours were used in conjunction or worn separately.

3rd to 19th-century
Contrary to antiquity era, physical evidence of Middle Age and Pre-modern Vietnamese armours found by far is extremely rare. The knowledge of their existence is acquired almost solely through depictions in historical texts and arts. History of Song informs that in 981, the Song was victorious over Annam and took ten thousands suits of armour as spoil.

Armour were fabricated from various types of material. Better known materials are iron and leather. Warlord Nguyễn Nộn wore a suit of iron which failed to protect him from a pike thrust in his back. The Compilation of Lê Dynasty's customs noted that each magistrate of each county or market was require to collect 100 buffalo hides and 2 horns each hide to fashion armours and weapons.

Gallery

See also
Lamellar armour
Mirror armour
Military history of Vietnam

References

Asian armour
Military history of Vietnam
Military equipment of Vietnam